Charles Turner Howard (1832–1885) was an American businessman notable for organizing the Louisiana State Lottery Company in 1869. This corporation bribed Louisiana lawmakers to enable it to stay in business, and the firm amassed a considerable fortune over the years while Howard led a controversial life. He died at age 53 after a fall off of a carriage in Dobbs Ferry, New York, but his family continued his efforts at philanthropy and charitable giving.

Howard was born in Baltimore and attended college in this city. He moved south, and worked as a newsdealer and then later as a lottery and policy dealer. When the Civil War broke out, Howard's business dealings were described as "obscure" according to a report in The New York Times. At a later point in his life, he claimed to have been a soldier for the confederate side for Tennessee, but this was subsequently disproven. In 1866, he was hired by the Kentucky lottery firm of C. H. Murray & Company to apply for a lottery charter in Louisiana from the state legislature. This effort failed, but after two years, a second attempt succeeded, partially as a result of bribery of key lawmakers in Louisiana. Howard was given $50,000 to apply for a charter and when the legislative grant came through, he refused to turn the charter over to his employers. A member of the firm of C. H. Murray & Co. named Marcus Cicero Stanley filed suit against Howard for being refused his "just share of the profits". The suit alleged that Howard had bribed a "large number of legislators" as well as an ex-Governor of Louisiana. But the lawsuit was dropped because it was decided that, given the nature of the gambling business, that the parties had no legal standing to enforce the contract.

The Louisiana Lottery Company gave Howard and his partners profits of 50%, and business began in January 1869. Howard used monies from the lottery to help win favor with the state legislature.

Howard and his partners were adept at using money and influence to keep the lottery going and profitable. At one point, a state Constitutional Convention was about to be passed which would have outlawed the lottery, but "false pretenses, bribery and coercion" were used to ensure that any new constitution did not exclude the lottery. At one point, a Louisiana judge made some "extraneous remarks" which had "no legal value" which said that the new Louisiana Constitution had "legalized" the Louisiana Lottery, and Howard made sure not to appeal this decision. During its heyday, the firm divided about $2 million annually among stockholders, including Howard, as well as pay for the numerous bribes for public officials.

Howard built a beautiful house on St. Charles Street in New Orleans with a garden described as the "finest in the city." He had a second home in Dobbs Ferry, a suburb of New York City. He acquired a reputation for giving generously to the city's charitable institutions. While he was a social climber, he did not respond kindly to snubs, and he "got even" with groups and organizations which had excluded him, such as the Metairie Jockey Club and the La Variétés Club, by waiting patiently, buying up the properties at propitious times, and casting out the snubbers.

Howard was involved in controversy on several occasions. When a serious fever struck New Orleans in 1878, one report suggested that Howard has not contributed any monies to a relief effort. In 1879, he was arrested in New York City for starting lottery agencies to sell shares or tickets of the Louisiana State Lottery. A detective charged that he had been selling lottery tickets which had been against the laws of New York State at the time. There was no record of Howard having spent any time in jail, but he was reported to own an interest in a sugar plantation, own a "stud of horses", have financial interests in two New Orleans newspapers, and at one point aspired to the office of Governor of Louisiana.

Howard died in a carriage accident in 1885 when he was thrown from the vehicle and severely injured.

Howard's son, Frank T. Howard, continued in the lottery business and amassed fortunes, according to one account, with revenues of $4,000,000 a month reported, with about 60% of that being paid out in the form of prizes. Howard's daughter, Annie Howard, along with her brothers helped to build the Howard Memorial Library as well as the Louisiana Historical Annex, which has a collection of Confederate archives, including the private and state papers of southern president Jefferson Davis.

References

Businesspeople from New Orleans
People from Dobbs Ferry, New York
Businesspeople from Baltimore
Philanthropists from New York (state)
History of New Orleans
1832 births
People in 19th-century Louisiana
19th-century American philanthropists
1885 deaths
19th-century American businesspeople